The Scots Army (Scots: Scots Airmy) was the army of the Kingdom of Scotland between the Restoration in 1660 and the Acts of Union of 1707. A small standing army was established at the Restoration, which was mainly engaged in opposing Covenanter rebellions and guerrilla warfare pursued by the Cameronians in the East. There were also attempts to found a larger militia. By the Glorious Revolution in 1688–89 the standing army was over 3,500 men. Several new regiments were raised to defend the new regime and, although some were soon disbanded several took part in William II's continental wars. By the time of the Act of Union in 1707, the army had seven units of infantry, two of horse and one troop of Horse Guards. Early units wore grey, but adopted red like the English army after 1684. New Scottish and particularly Highland regiments would be raised from the 1740s, some of which had a long history within the army.

History
At the Restoration in 1660 the Privy Council of Scotland established a force of several infantry regiments and a few troops of horse to act as a standing army. These included a troop of Life Guards, a second troop of which was raised in 1661, Lieutenant-general William Drummond's Regiment of Horse, five independent troops of horse, a regiment of Foot Guards, later known as the Scots Guards and Le Regiment de Douglas, formed and serving in France since 1633, which returned and eventually became the Royal Regiment of Foot. There were also attempts to found a national militia of 20,000 foot and 2,000 horse on the English model. The standing army was mainly employed in the suppression of Covenanter rebellions and the guerrilla war undertaken by the Cameronians in the East. In addition a "Foote Company of Highland Men" was raised and three troops of Scots Dragoons in 1678. Another three were added to make The Royal Regiment of Scots Dragoons in 1681, by which point they were already mounted on grey horses that would give them their name of the Royal Scots Greys. On the eve of the Glorious Revolution the standing army in Scotland was about 3,000 men in various regiments and another 268 veterans in the major garrison towns, at an annual cost of about £80,000.

After the Glorious Revolution of 1688–89 ten regiments were raised for the defense of the regime. Some were soon disbanded, but others served against Jacobite rebels, in Ireland and increasingly in William II's continental wars, beginning with the Nine Years' War in Flanders (1689–97). Their role was of such importance that the Scots Parliament forced Queen Anne to give royal assent to the controversial 1704 Act of Security by threatening to withdraw all Scottish forces back out of the Confederate armies. By the time of the Act of Union in 1707, the Kingdom of Scotland had a standing army of seven units of infantry, two of horse and one troop of Horse Guards, besides varying levels of fortress artillery in the garrison castles of Edinburgh, Dumbarton, and Stirling. The new British Army created by the Act of Union incorporated the existing Scottish regiments and some units would have a long regimental history, while new Scottish regiments, particularly of Highlanders, would be raised from the 1740s.

Uniforms
Early units were probably dressed in homespun woollen cloth of hodden grey, which had been used during the Wars of the Three Kingdoms in the 1640s. Dragoons continued to wear grey, but from 1684 red cloth was imported from England to make uniforms that matched those of the English Army. The dragoons also eventually adopted red. Militia units may have been uniformed in blue. Units were differentiated by contrasting colours visible on the collars and cuffs on a regimental basis.

Regimental histories
The following is a list of regiments commissioned between 1660 and 1707.

See also
Military history of Scotland
Warfare in early modern Scotland

References

Further reading

Military of Scotland
Armies by country
Disbanded armies
1707 disestablishments in Scotland
Military units and formations disestablished in 1707
Military units and formations established in 1660
1660 establishments in Scotland
Kingdom of Scotland